The San Leone is a river in the Province of Agrigento, Sicily, Italy. Its source is in the commune of Santa Elisabetta and it discharges into the Mediterranean Sea in San Leone, a frazione of the city of Agrigento. It has various names along its course: at its source it is called Akragas, further downstream Drago, then Sant'Anna (the ancient Hypsas) and the final 3 km until its mouth San Leone. Its largest tributary is the San Biagio (also: San Benedetto). In the 19th century it was known as Fiume di Girgenti.

Notes

Rivers of Italy
Rivers of Sicily
Rivers of the Province of Agrigento
European drainage basins of the Mediterranean Sea